Sprite Tropical Mix is a line of "remixed" colorless caffeine-free sodas and drink-flavoring packets made by The Coca-Cola Company. Sprite Remix is one of the most uncommonly known Sprite flavors. Although based on Sprite, the Remixes were each flavored differently from the original. It was discontinued in 2005 in the United States. In the spring of 2015, the Tropical Sprite Remix flavor was reintroduced under the name Sprite Tropical and renamed Sprite Tropical Mix a year later.

Flavors
 Sprite Tropical Remix: Sprite with tropical fruit flavors, introduced 2002; reintroduced as Sprite Tropical in Spring 2015. Renamed Sprite Tropical Mix in Spring 2016.
 Sprite BerryClear Remix: Sprite with berry flavors, introduced in April 2004.
 Sprite Aruba Jam Remix: Sprite with fruit flavors, introduced in April 2005, short-lived.

'Remix Flavor Hits' packets

Coca-Cola also had a do-it-yourself promotion, where it offered free 1.25 ounce (36.9 ml.) flavor packets, which consumers ripped open and poured into their Sprite.  Flavors included grape, vanilla, and cherry flavor.

Sprite Tropical Mix
Sprite Tropical Remix was re-released in the spring of 2015 under new branding. Sources on Twitter, Facebook, and Instagram have shown it popping up in the eastern United States, with eBay listings also appearing.

After a limited-roll out in spring 2015 and no public mention from Coca-Cola, the official Sprite website was updated showing the limited time re-release for Sprite Tropical Mix on February 29, 2016. The new bottle label shows that the tropical flavors are lemon/lime, strawberry, and pineapple.

In 2018, Sprite introduced a similar drink, 'MIX by Sprite Tropic Berry, exclusive to McDonald's restaurants. Along with the base lemon-lime flavor, Tropic Berry includes a blend of strawberry, orange, and pineapple flavor.

In 2019, The Coca-Cola Company redesigned Sprite packaging, replacing the drink's former retro branding with uniform minimalist branding, matching that of other flavors in the Sprite lineup.

References

Coca-Cola brands